Matee Ajavon (born May 7, 1986) is a Liberian American basketball player. A 5'8" guard, Ajavon was chosen by the Houston Comets as the fifth overall draft pick in the 2008 WNBA Draft.

Early life
As a child, Ajavon immigrated to the United States with her family from Monrovia, Liberia.

High school
Ajavon graduated from Malcolm X Shabazz High School in Newark, New Jersey.  She led the Shabazz girls' basketball team to victory in the State of New Jersey's "Tournament of Champions" in both 2003 and 2004, the first time a school had repeated as champion. Ajavon was named a WBCA All-American. She participated in the 2004 WBCA High School All-America Game, where she scored nine points.

College
Ajavon graduated from Rutgers University in 2008, having majored in Africana Studies.  She was a key member of the 2006–2007 Scarlet Knights women's basketball team that reached the NCAA Championship game.

College statistics
Source

USA Basketball
Ajavon played for the USA team in the 2007 Pan American Games in Rio de Janeiro, Brazil. The team won all five games, earning the gold medal for the event.

Professional
Ajavon played primarily off the bench during her rookie WNBA season, but averaged 8.0 points per game. When the Houston Comets folded in 2008, Ajavon was selected second in the dispersal draft by the Washington Mystics.

During the 2008–2010 WNBA offseason, Ajavon played in the EuroLeague Women for Fenerbahçe Istanbul.

In her first season with Washington, Ajavon put up remarkably similar numbers to her first WNBA campaign.  Again mainly playing as a reserve, she scored 8.0 points per game.  Ajavon helped the Mystics reach the playoffs, where she played well, scoring 19 points in just 34 total minutes, but Washington suffered a two-game sweep at the hands of the Indiana Fever.

WNBA career statistics

Regular season

|-
| align="left" | 2008
| align="left" | Houston
| 34 || 2 || 17.8 || .332 || .194 || .791 || 1.8 || 1.7 || 0.9 || 0.2 || 1.5 || 8.0
|-
| align="left" | 2009
| align="left" | Washington
| 34 || 4 || 17.3 || .336 || .341 || .673 || 1.9 || 1.1 || 1.1 || 0.1 || 1.4 || 8.0
|-
| align="left" | 2010
| align="left" | Washington
| 34 || 0 || 14.6 || .346 || .184 || .773 || 1.6 || 1.4 || 1.1 || 0.1 || 1.5 || 5.9
|-
| align="left" | 2011
| align="left" | Washington
| 34 || 33 || 31.3 || .391 || .276 || .829 || 2.4 || 3.1 || 1.7 || 0.3 || 3.0 || 14.7
|-
| align="left" | 2012
| align="left" | Washington
| 33 || 22 || 21.6 || .299 || .301 || .827 || 1.8 || 2.0 || 1.6|| 0.2 || 1.9 || 7.9
|-
| align="left" | 2013
| align="left" | Washington
| 34 || 27 || 21.6 || .299 || .301 || .827 || 1.7 || 2.9 || 0.9 || 0.0 || 2.2 || 8.9
|-
| align="left" | 2014
| align="left" | Atlanta
| 24 || 1 || 9.2 || .278 || .111 || .724 || 1.7 || 2.9 || 0.9 || 0.0 || 0.9 || 2.2
|-
| align="left" | 2015
| align="left" | Atlanta
| 33 || 11 || 17.6 || .405 || .167 || .822 || 1.8 || 2.5 || 1.4 || 0.1 || 1.8 || 5.9
|-
| align="left" | 2016
| align="left" | Atlanta
| 33 || 2 || 10.6 || .305 || .231 || .750 || 1.6 || 1.2 || 0.3 || 0.2 || 1.0 || 3.3
|-
| align="left" | 2017
| align="left" | Atlanta
| 31 || 2 || 8.1 || .289 || .000 || .795 || 1.2 || 1.0 || 0.3 || 0.0 || 0.9 || 2.4
|-
| align="left" | Career
| align="left" |10 years, 3 teams
| 323 || 104 || 17.4 || .347 || .266 || .782 || 1.8 || 1.8 || 1.0 || 0.1 || 1.7 || 6.9

Postseason

|-
| align="left" | 2009
| align="left" | Washington
| 2 || 0 || 17.0 || .375 || .250 || .833 || 2.5 || 1.5 || 2.0 || 0.0 || 1.0 || 9.5
|-
| align="left" | 2010
| align="left" | Washington
| 2 || 0 || 17.5 || .440 || .400 || .750 || 0.0 || 1.5 || 1.5 || 0.0 || 1.0 || 18.0
|-
| align="left" | 2013
| align="left" | Washington
| 3 || 3 || 21.9 || .235 || .000 || .750 || 3.3 || 2.3 || 2.0 || 0.0 || 2.6 || 4.7
|-
| align="left" | 2014
| align="left" | Atlanta
| 2 || 0 || 17.5 || .000 || .000 || .000 || 1.0 || 0.5 || 0.0 || 0.0 || 0.5 || 0.0
|-
| align="left" | 2016
| align="left" | Atlanta
| 2 || 1 || 15.6 || .500 || .000  || 1.000 || 2.5 || 0.5 || 0.0 || 0.0 || 1.5 || 7.0
|-
| align="left" | Career
| align="left" |5 years, 2 team
| 11 || 4 || 15.7 || .368 || .190 || .806 || 2.0 || 1.4 || 1.2 || 0.0 || 1.5 || 7.5

Notes

External links
https://web.archive.org/web/20081211021412/http://www.wnba.com/playerfile/matee_ajavon/index.html
https://web.archive.org/web/20081030112724/http://scarletknights.com/basketball-women/roster/ajavon.asp

1986 births
Living people
American expatriate basketball people in Romania
American expatriate basketball people in Turkey
American women's basketball players
Atlanta Dream players
Basketball players at the 2007 Pan American Games
Basketball players from Newark, New Jersey
Club Sportiv Municipal Târgoviște players
Fenerbahçe women's basketball players
Houston Comets players
Liberian emigrants to the United States
Liberian women's basketball players
Malcolm X Shabazz High School alumni
Point guards
Rutgers Scarlet Knights women's basketball players
Shooting guards
Sportspeople from Monrovia
Washington Mystics players
Pan American Games gold medalists for the United States
Pan American Games medalists in basketball
Medalists at the 2007 Pan American Games
United States women's national basketball team players